The University of Edinburgh School of Philosophy, Psychology and Language Sciences (PPLS) is a school within the College of Humanities and Social Science at the University of Edinburgh. The School was formed in 2002 as a result of administrative restructuring, when several departments of what was then the Faculty of Arts were brought together. The University of Edinburgh's academic foundation is based on three Colleges containing a total of 22 Schools; among these is the School of Philosophy, Psychology, and Language Sciences (PPLS).

The School is composed of three subject areas:
 Philosophy 
 Psychology
 Linguistics and English Language (LEL)

Research

Within the School, research in Psychology is organized along 3 broad themes:

 Differential Psychology, which looks at individual differences in the way people think, behave, and feel emotions differently.
 Human Cognitive Neuroscience, which studies memory, attention, executive function, visual memory, sensory integration, and perceptuo-motor control in adults who function normally and those who possess disorders within the nervous system.
 Language Cognition and Communication, which covers topics in linguistic comprehension,  understanding, invention and conversation.

The Centre for Cognitive Ageing and Cognitive Epidemiology (CCACE) was a "centre of excellence" to advance research into how ageing affects cognition, and how mental ability in youth affects health and longevity.  It was funded by the Medical Research Council (MRC), ESRC, BBSRC and EPSRC through the LLHW MRC's Lifelong Health and Wellbeing scheme, the Centre was led by Ian Deary.

References

External links 
 Philosophy at Edinburgh
 Psychology at Edinburgh
 Linguistics and English Language at Edinburgh
 School of Philosophy, Psychology, and Language Science

Literatures, Languages and Cultures
Psychology institutes
Schools of the University of Edinburgh
Research institutes in Edinburgh
Language schools in the United Kingdom